Wasim Sajjad (born 30 March 1941) is a Pakistani conservative politician and lawyer who served as the acting president of Pakistan for two non-consecutive terms and as the Chairman of the Senate between 1988 and 1999.

Born in Jalandhar, British India, Sajjad's father (Justice Sajjad Ahmad Jan) went on to serve as a judge of the Supreme Court, later becoming Chief Election Commissioner of Pakistan. Sajjad studied at the Army Burn Hall before moving to Lahore where he studied law at the Punjab University. As a Rhodes Scholar, he moved to Oxfordshire, where he received his Bachelor of Civil Law followed by a graduate degree in Jurisprudence from the Wadham College, Oxford in 1967. He was called to the Bar at the Inner Temple in 1968. On return to Pakistan, Sajjad was admitted as a lawyer in Pakistan and joined the Punjab Law College where he taught constitutional law between 1967 and 1977.

Political career 
Sajjad was elected as to the Senate in 1985 as a member of the center-right Muslim League and served as the Minister for Law and Justice from September 1986 to December 1988, until December 1988 when he was elected as Chairman of the Senate where he remained until 1997. During which he served as acting President of Pakistan twice during the general elections. In 1999, Sajjad joined a defecting group that supported General Musharraf's coup and became the Leader of the House in the Senate of Pakistan in 2003, remaining until his political retirement in 2008. After the imposition of the coup by General Pervez Musharraf, Sajjad joined the PML(Q) and again became a senator. This time he served as Leader of the House in the Senate of Pakistan from March 2003 to March 2008. Thereafter he served as Leader of the Opposition from 2010 until 2012. After retiring from politics, he has been serving as Chairman of the Foundation for Advancement of Science and Technology (FAST), and the chancellor of the National University of Computer and Emerging Sciences.

In 2002, Sajjad was accused of mis-use of government vehicles and phones, amounting to millions of rupees. He was ordered to pay a fine, but served no time in jail.

See also 

 List of Pakistanis
 Chairman of the Senate of Pakistan
 Acting President of Pakistan
 National University of Computer and Emerging Sciences
 Ministry of Interior

References

External links 
 

1941 births
Alumni of the Inns of Court School of Law
Chairmen of the Senate of Pakistan
Living people
Members of the Inner Temple
Pakistani lawyers
Pakistani Rhodes Scholars
People from Jalandhar
Acting presidents of Pakistan
Punjabi people
Members of the Senate of Pakistan
Federal ministers of Pakistan
Army Burn Hall College alumni
People from Lahore